Conscious Alliance is a national 501(c)(3) nonprofit organization committed to supporting communities in crisis through hunger relief and youth empowerment.

Organization 
Conscious Alliance operates grassroots food collection and hunger awareness programs throughout the United States, primarily by organizing food drives at concerts and music events. Donations to Conscious Alliance benefit America's local food pantries and economically isolated Native American Reservations. Conscious Alliance has hosted hundreds of food drives at music festivals including Bonnaroo, Power to the Peaceful, and Wakarusa, and at concerts by artists such as The String Cheese Incident, STS9, Jack Johnson, Michael Franti & Spearhead, Dave Matthews, Phil Lesh, Bassnectar, and many others.

References

External links 

 Official website

Charities based in Colorado
Social welfare charities based in the United States